Pedalanka may refer to:
 Pedalanka, Bhattirpolu mandal, an Indian village in Bhattiprolu mandal
 Pedalanka, Kollur mandal, an Indian village in Kollur mandal